Netaji Stadium is a multi-purpose stadium in Port Blair, Andaman and Nicobar Islands. The stadium hosts the major local football and cricket matches, and other public events.

There were proposal and international level cricket stadium to be constructed in these Islands where a few Ranji Trophy matches could be organized to begin with simultaneously the Andaman & Nicobar Cricket Association need be formed and affiliated and registered with BCCI in tune with other state Associations.

References

External links
 Wikimapia

Cricket grounds in the Andaman and Nicobar Islands
Sports venues in the Andaman and Nicobar Islands
Port Blair
Memorials to Subhas Chandra Bose
Year of establishment missing